Pointelle is a knit fabric pattern with tiny holes typically in the shape of chevrons; the structure is geometric in shape and with repeated design similar to lace. It is a fine knit pattern with small open spaces, subtle stripe, and floral effects. The fabric is lightweight, airy, and of a very delicate nature. Pointelle is possible on warp knitting and weaving also.

Etymology, and origin 
Origin, 1950s, probably from a point in the sense ‘lace made entirely with a needle’ + the French diminutive suffix -elle.

Fabric construction 
Pointelle fabric is an intricate pattern as compared to simple knitting structures like jersey fabric. In Pointelle knitting, the yarn does not form a complete loop and create a hole. The pointelle knitting requires jacquard controlled knitting machines. The jacquard machines equipped with computers, wheels, punching cards, etc., allow the knitter more adjustments of yarn feeding, knitting, and tucking positions. These settings help in producing required motifs and complex design and pattern making. The size of the Pointelle holes is adjustable to an extent with needle selection on the machine. The resultant fabric is a lightweight, delicate fabric, it is stretchable and comfortable to wear structure. In knitting, the transfer knit is used to create the design. It is possible with the jersey and rib structures.

Uses 
It is used predominantly in clothing manufacturing, due to its appearance and fabric characteristics, it is suitable for Men's,  kids wear and feminine dresses. The fabric is also used for cardigan, tops, T-shirts, pajamas, night suits, and lingerie.

References 

Knitted fabrics